The Riot Act is a 2018 American period thriller film.

The film stars Brett Cullen, Connor Price, Brandon Keener, and Micah Hauptman. It is the debut feature film from writer-director Devon Parks.

Production
Principal photography finished in Arkansas in February 2018, and was released on September 14, 2018.

Reception
Outtake Magazine said it "is as solid as many mass-produced period drama you are likely to get. It tries too hard, but Parks’ design props the film up just enough to make it worth sitting through until an expertly staged conclusion."

References

External links 

2018 films
American thriller films
2010s thriller films
2010s English-language films
2010s American films